is a locality (a ) in Kamakura, Kanagawa prefecture, Japan, defined as the part of town north of the Ebisubashi bridge on the Namerigawa. The part of town south of the same bridge is called .

Notes

References 
 

Kamakura, Kanagawa